Reuti may refer to:

 Reuti (Bussnang), a part of the municipality of Bussnang, Thurgau, Switzerland
 Reuti (Hasliberg), a village in the municipality of Hasliberg, Bern, Switzerland